Daniel Gordon Hinkle (April 3, 1905 – March 19, 1972) was an American professional baseball player, coach and manager. Born in Toronto, Ohio, he saw service in Major League Baseball as a backup catcher for the  Boston Red Sox and as a coach for the  Detroit Tigers.

Hinkle had a ten-season playing career, beginning in 1930 in the St. Louis Cardinals' farm system. The Red Sox acquired him in December 1933 and used him in 27 games to spell regular catcher Rick Ferrell, a future member of the Baseball Hall of Fame. In his one-season MLB career, Hinkle was a .173 hitter (13 hits in 75 at bats) with nine RBI, including seven runs scored, six doubles and one triple. He did not hit a home run. In 26 catching appearances, he posted a .992 fielding percentage, committing one error in 119 chances. 

Hinkle returned to minor league baseball in 1935 and, apart from spending 1939 as the Tigers' bullpen coach, he spent the remainder of his baseball career in the minors as a player and manager, through 1948.  He died in Houston, Texas, at age 66.

His younger brother Clarke Hinkle set the NFL career rushing record and was inducted into the Pro Football Hall of Fame in 1964.

External links
Baseball Reference

1905 births
1972 deaths
Baltimore Orioles (IL) players
Baseball players from Ohio
Beaumont Exporters players
Boston Red Sox players
Columbus Red Birds players
Detroit Tigers coaches
Greensboro Patriots players
Indianapolis Indians players
Little Rock Travelers players
Major League Baseball bullpen coaches
Major League Baseball catchers
Minor league baseball managers
People from Toronto, Ohio
Portsmouth Cubs players
Rochester Red Wings players
Syracuse Chiefs players
Toledo Mud Hens players
Toronto Maple Leafs (International League) players